Lukas Schlemmer (born 5 March 1995) is an Austrian cyclist, who most recently rode for UCI Continental team .

Major results
2014
 8th GP Polski
2016
 1st  Mountains classification Tour of Szeklerland
 1st Stage 2 Tour de Berlin
2017
 1st  Road race, National Under-23 Road Championships
 5th GP Izola
2018
 1st Stage 2 Szlakiem Walk Majora Hubala
 2nd GP Laguna
2019
 1st Prologue Oberösterreich Rundfahrt

References

External links

1995 births
Living people
Austrian male cyclists
Place of birth missing (living people)